Micros Systems, Inc., was an American computer company who manufactured hardware and developed software and services for the restaurant point of sale, hotel, hospitality, sports and entertainment venues, casinos, cruise lines, specialty retail markets and other similar markets. Analyst estimates cited in 2003 put Micros' market share at about 35% of the restaurant point-of-sale business. Independently active from 1978 to 2014, Micros is now owned by Oracle Corporation and renamed Oracle Food and Beverage and Oracle Hospitality (two of the global business units at Oracle Corporation). Micros was headquartered in Columbia, Maryland, United States, and the current business unit it still based there.

On June 23, 2014, Oracle Corporation announced its intent to purchase Micros Systems for $68 per share in cash for a total value of approximately $5.3 billion.

History 

The company was incorporated in 1977 as Picos Manufacturing, Inc. and changed its name to Micros Systems, Inc. in 1978. Micros Systems, Inc. was headquartered in Columbia, Maryland. The name Micros is an acronym for Modular Integrated Cash Register Operating Systems.

Products 
Oracle offers multiple products under the Micros name. Oracle Micros Simphony is a cloud-based restaurant POS system. Opera is the Micros property management system used in many large hotel chains, such as Accor Hotels, Meliá Hotels International, Four Seasons Hotels and Resorts, Travelodge Hotels UK, Crown Resorts, Hyatt Hotels and Resorts, Rydges Hotels & Resorts, Oberoi Hotels & Resorts, Jupiter Hotels, Marriott Hotels & Resorts, Starwood Hotels and Resorts, Resorts and Suites, Radisson Hotels and Resorts (subsidiary of Carlson Companies), the InterContinental Hotels Group and the Thistle Hotels.

With the purchase of the company Torex from Cerberus Capital Management, Micros acquired MiRetail Hub, a Workflow application written using Windows Workflow Foundation and designed for the Retail market.

Subsidiaries

References

External links 
 

1977 establishments in Maryland
2014 disestablishments in Maryland
2014 mergers and acquisitions
American companies established in 1977
American companies disestablished in 2014
Computer companies established in 1977
Computer companies disestablished in 2014
Companies based in Columbia, Maryland
Companies formerly listed on the Nasdaq
Defunct computer companies of the United States
Defunct computer hardware companies
Defunct software companies of the United States
Oracle acquisitions
Point of sale companies
Travel technology